Australian Formula 3 has been the name applied to two distinctly different motor racing categories, separated by over twenty years.

The original Australian Formula 3 was introduced in 1964 based on the FIA Formula 3 of the period and intended as a cost-efficient open wheel category to run at state level for amateur racers. It was discontinued at the end of 1977.

Formula 3 was reintroduced to Australia in 1999, again based on FIA Formula 3. An Australian Formula 3 Championship was sanctioned by the Confederation of Australian Motor Sport for the first time in 2001. From 2005 to 2014 the Australian Drivers' Championship title (CAMS Gold Star) was also awarded to the winner of the championship. For 2015 the series reverted to the single title of Australian Formula 3 Championship. Following the withdrawal of national championship status, an Australian Formula 3 Premier Series has been contested since 2016.

History – The First Era

The Australian Formula 3 category was introduced by the Confederation of Australian Motor Sport in 1964 as the fourth tier of formula car racing in Australia, below the Australian National Formula, the Australian 1½ Litre Formula and Australian Formula 2. Initially the formula was as per FIA Formula 3, with cars restricted to using production based engines of under 1000cc capacity with overhead camshafts not permitted. For 1969 the engine capacity limit was increased to 1100cc and the prohibition on overhead camshafts was removed. 1972 saw the engine capacity limit lifted to 1300cc. 1977 was to be the last year of the first era of Australian Formula 3 as the category was discontinued at the end of the season. Formula 3 was never run under national championship status, although there were State Championships and the Stillwell Series.

History – The Modern Era

The modern era began when 2 Litre Formula 3 cars were introduced into Australia in 1999, competing alongside 1600cc Australian Formula 2 cars in the Australian Formula 2 National Series. 
 In the following year CAMS introduced FIA specifications for Formula 3 cars in Australia and Formula 3 drivers now had their own Formula 3 National Series. Agreement was reached with CAMS to grant National Championship status to the Formula 3 Series for 2001 and it officially became the Australian Formula 3 Championship in that year. By the 2005 season CAMS had decreed that Australian Formula 3 was now Australia's premier open-wheel racing car class (displacing Formula 4000) and as such the Australian Drivers' Championship title (and the associated CAMS Gold  Star) would be awarded on the results of the Australian Formula 3 Championship.

List of Champions
Following the running of a National Series in 1999 and 2000, official national title status was granted by the Confederation of Australian Motorsport from 2001 onwards. From 2005 to 2014 the winner of the Australian Formula 3 Championship was also awarded the CAMS Gold Star and the Australian Drivers' Championship title. In 2015 CAMS stripped the Gold Star Award from the Australian Formula 3 Championship citing low grid numbers. With the loss of national championship status for 2016 the series was renamed the Australian Formula 3 Premier Series. Aligning with the Australian Motor Racing Series from 2019 the series returned to National Championship status.

Australian Formula 3 National Series

Australian Formula 3 Championship

Australian Formula 3 Championship / Australian Drivers' Championship

Australian Formula 3 Championship
The Australian Formula 3 Championship was renamed the Australian Formula 3 Premier Series by Formula 3 Management Pty Ltd from 2016-2018, returning to Australian Formula 3 Championship from 2019.

List of constructors in Australian Formula 3

Cars built by the following constructors have raced in Australian Formula 3

Historic Era
Aztec
Birrana
 Elfin
 Cheetah
Alpha Sports Productions ASP

Modern Era
Dallara
Mygale
Reynard

References

External links
 Official Web Page formula3.com.au
 Sporting & Technical Regulations and Commercial Arrangements Retrieved from www.camsmanual.com.au on 21 July 2009
 Confederation of Australian Motor Sport cams.com.au
 CAMS Manual camsmanual.com.au

 
1999 establishments in Australia
Formula racing
Motorsport categories in Australia